Rusizi Football Club is a football club from the city of Cibitoke in Burundi. The team currently plays in the top domestic Burundi Premier League and have their home games in the Stade Municipal.

External links
Soccerway

Football clubs in Burundi